"The Hawk of Lebanon" is a popular song in the Arab world about Hezbollah leader Hassan Nasrallah. The song was written by little known Palestinian boy band Firkat al-Shamal (Band of the North) at the height of the 2006 Israel-Lebanon conflict. 

The lyrics consist of constant repetition of a few simple rhymes: "Hey, you, hawk of Lebanon. Hey, you, Nasrallah. Your men are from Hezbollah and victory is yours with God's help." Lead singer and manager Alaa Abu al-Haija, 28, said he gives the audiences what they want to hear. "I see people turning toward Islam, so I have to sing to that," said Alaa.

Palestinian fever for the song brought together supporters of Hamas and Fatah who are usually divided in the Palestinian society.

Trivia 
 Another song called "Yalla Ya Nasrallah" by an Israeli group was also written about Nasrallah during the same time. However, the song has an alternate view of Hassan Nasrallah, calling him an orangutang with lice in his beard.

References

External links
 The Hawk Of Lebanon MP3
 Police confiscates CDs with “inflammatory song”  Freemuse article

2006 songs
2006 Lebanon War
Palestinian music